The 1926 All-Ireland Junior Hurling Championship was the ninth staging of the All-Ireland Junior Championship since its establishment by the Gaelic Athletic Association in 1912.

Cork entered the championship as the defending champions, however, they were beaten by Tipperary in the Munster final.

The All-Ireland final was played on 13 March 1927 at Thurles Sportsfield, between Tipperary and Galway, in what was their first meeting in a final since 1924. Tipperary won the match by 6-02 to 2-03 to claim their fourth championship title overall and a first title since 1924.

Results

All-Ireland Junior Hurling Championship

All-Ireland semi-final

All-Ireland final

References

Junior
All-Ireland Junior Hurling Championship